Hans Eisenmann  (April 15, 1923 - August 31, 1987) was a German politician, representative of the Christian Social Union of Bavaria.

He was a member of the Landtag of Bavaria in the 1950s. From 1969 until his death he was Bavarian State Minister for Agriculture and Forestry.

See also
List of Bavarian Christian Social Union politicians

Ministers of the Bavaria State Government
Christian Social Union in Bavaria politicians
1923 births
1987 deaths